Edward Mervyn Patterson FRSE FRGS FGS FSAScot (14 March 1920 – 11 April 1997) was an Irish-born research chemist and geologist. He was president of the Geological Society of Glasgow from 1964 to 1967.

Early life and education
He was born in Northern Ireland on 14 March 1920, the son of John Wilson Patterson, a civil servant, and his wife, Dorothy Mary Ekin. He was educated at Bangor Grammar School. He then studied chemistry at Queen's University Belfast, earning a BSc in 1941.

Career 
After earning his bachelor's degree, Patterson began work as a research chemist, specialising in explosives. In 1947, he began lecturing in geology at the University of St Andrews. In 1954, he became the plant manager at Nobel's Explosive Company at Ardeer, North Ayrshire in west Scotland, remaining there until retiring in 1982.

In 1957 he was elected a fellow of the Royal Society of Edinburgh. His proposers were Frederick Walker, Samuel James Shand, Sergei Tomkeieff, Archibald Gordon MacGregor and James Ernest Richey.

Personal life

Patterson was married to Violet Adams. He died on 11 April 1997.

References

1920 births
1997 deaths
People educated at Bangor Grammar School
Scientists from Northern Ireland
Academics of the University of St Andrews
Fellows of the Royal Society of Edinburgh
Alumni of Queen's University Belfast
20th-century British geologists
20th-century British chemists